Pertosa is a village and comune of the province of Salerno in the Campania region of south-west Italy. In 2010 its population was 714.

History

Geography
The village is situated in the eastern side of the province of Salerno, close to the municipalities of Auletta, Polla and Caggiano and to Alburni mountains. Its only hamlet (frazione) is the little village of Muraglione, in which are located the show caves.

Demographics
At the census in 2001 the town had a population of 727, a drop from the 897 at the previous census in 1991.

Main sights

Pertosa is a receptive tourist place principally for its karst show cave system, the Pertosa Caves (Grotte di Pertosa). The caves are located in the valley below the town, by the river Tanagro.

Gallery

See also
Cilento
Vallo di Diano

References

External links

 Pertosa municipal website
 Official site of the caves

Cities and towns in Campania
Localities of Cilento